Michael Joseph Truncale (born August 30, 1957) is a United States district judge of the United States District Court for the Eastern District of Texas.

Biography 

Truncale was born in 1957 in Beaumont, Texas. He earned his Bachelor of Arts from Lamar University in 1978, his Master of Business Administration from the University of North Texas in 1980, and his Juris Doctor from the Dedman School of Law in 1985.

From 1985 to 2019, he was an associate turned partner at Orgain Bell & Tucker.

Governor of Texas Rick Perry appointed Truncale a Regent of the Texas State University System for a four-year term and Governor Greg Abbott appointed him to a six-year term as a member of the state Prepaid Higher Education Tuition Board.

He garnered 14.2% in the Republican primary, taking third place to Pearland City Councilwoman Felicia Harris and state Representative Randy Weber, the eventual winner.

Federal judicial service 

On January 23, 2018, President Donald Trump nominated Truncale to the seat on the United States District Court for the Eastern District of Texas vacated by Judge Ron Clark, who had previously announced his decision to assume senior status on February 28, 2018. On April 25, 2018, a hearing on his nomination was held before the Senate Judiciary Committee. Under questioning by Democratic U.S. Senator Mazie Hirono, Truncale, who previously served as an election judge in Texas, said he had personally witnessed incidents of voter fraud. Hirono challenged him, saying that she did not believe the problem of voter fraud to be widespread. On May 24, 2018, his nomination was reported out of committee by an 11–10 vote. 

On January 3, 2019, his nomination was returned to the President under Rule XXXI, Paragraph 6 of the United States Senate. On January 23, 2019, President Trump announced his intent to renominate Truncale for a federal judgeship. His nomination was sent to the Senate later that day. On February 7, 2019, his nomination was reported out of committee by a 12–10 vote. On May 13, 2019, the Senate invoked cloture on his nomination by a 49–43 vote. On May 14, 2019, his nomination was confirmed by a 49–46 vote. Senator Mitt Romney voted against him because he called Barack Obama an "un-American imposter" in 2011. Truncale said he was "merely expressing frustration by what I perceived as a lack of overt patriotism on behalf of President Obama.'" He received his judicial commission on May 16, 2019.

Electoral history 
2012

See also 
 Donald Trump judicial appointment controversies

References

External links 
 

1957 births
Living people
20th-century American lawyers
21st-century American lawyers
21st-century American judges
21st-century American politicians
Candidates in the 2012 United States elections
Dedman School of Law alumni
Federalist Society members
Judges of the United States District Court for the Eastern District of Texas
Lamar University alumni
People from Beaumont, Texas
Texas lawyers
Texas Republicans
United States district court judges appointed by Donald Trump
University of North Texas alumni
University of Texas System regents